The Women's foil event took place on November 7, 2010 at Grand Palais.

Draw

Finals

Top half

Section 1

Section 2

Bottom half

Section 3

Section 4

References

External links
 Bracket

2010 World Fencing Championships
World